Noam Ross is an experienced disease ecologist and R (programming language) expert working out of New York.

Education 
In 2006, Noam Ross received his Bachelor of Science degree in Environmental Studies from Brown University. Ross continued his education at the University of California, Davis, where he received a Ph.D. in ecology in 2015. During his time at UC Davis, he gave multiple presentations at the Ecological Society of America Annual Meeting that covered "Modeling forest disease using a macroparasite framework" and "Optimal control of disease with individual-based models".

Occupational Work and Research 
Currently, Noam Ross is the Principal Scientists for Computational Research at EcoHealth Alliance. As a disease ecologist, Ross studies the transmission of diseases that originated from certain species and how they have effected other species, including humans. Using non-parametric models, Ross works to predict how and when these diseases will impact humanity.

COVID-19 Research 
EcoHealth Alliance, the employer of Noam Ross, works with The Global Virome Project (GVP), which is an association of experienced pandemic prevention minds. As part of the GVP, Ross studies what makes certain regions more susceptible to zoonotic viruses like COVID-19. The three main factors that determine how effective zoonotic viruses are immense biodiversity, signs of climate change, and land that has been affected by deforestation. Ross consulted with governor Andrew Cuomo's team to produce a cluster map to help stop the spread of COVID-19 in New York.

R Contributions 
Through his studies and occupation, Noam Ross has accumulated over eight years of R experience. Outside of his work with EcoHealth Alliance, Ross works with ROpenSci to create new R packages for the community to use. The majority of Ross's work with ROpenSci is editing packages that his peers produce. Ross is known for being outspoken about the DataCamp sexual assault scandal.

References 

Wikipedia Student Program

Living people
Year of birth missing (living people)